Andriy Dankiv (born 23 January 1987) is a professional Ukrainian football midfielder who plays for Toronto Atomic FC in the Canadian Soccer League.

Playing career 
Dankiv began his career in 2007 with FC Lviv in the Ukrainian First League. He had stints with FC Enerhetyk Burshtyn, FC Bukovyna Chernivtsi, FC Poltava, and FC UkrAhroKom Holovkivka. In 2015, he went overseas to Canada to sign with Toronto Atomic FC of the Canadian Soccer League.

References

External links
Profile on Official FC Lviv Website
Profile on EUFO
Profile on Football Squads

1987 births
Living people
Ukrainian footballers
FC Lviv players
FC Enerhetyk Burshtyn players
FC Bukovyna Chernivtsi players
FC Poltava players
Ukrainian Premier League players
FC UkrAhroKom Holovkivka players
Toronto Atomic FC players
Canadian Soccer League (1998–present) players
Association football midfielders